Joanna Chaube (born 25 September 1997) is a French badminton player.

Achievements

BWF International Challenge/Series
Mixed doubles

 BWF International Challenge tournament
 BWF International Series tournament
 BWF Future Series tournament

References

External links 

1997 births
Living people
French female badminton players
21st-century French women